Feriado (English: Holiday) is a 2014 Ecuadorian coming-of-age drama, written and directed by Diego Araujo. The film had its world premiere at the Berlinale, the 2014 Berlin International Film Festival.

Cast

References

https://www.berlinale.de/en/archiv/jahresarchive/2014/02_programm_2014/02_Filmdatenblatt_2014_20144003.php#tab=video25

External links
 

2014 films
Ecuadorian drama films